Stephen Cosh (31 January 1920 – 15 March 2017) was a Scottish cricketer. He played 36 first-class matches for Scotland between 1950 and 1959.

References

External links
 

1920 births
2017 deaths
Scottish cricketers
Sportspeople from Ayr